Duke Yǐ of Qi (reigned 10th century BC) was the third recorded ruler of the ancient Chinese state of Qi during the Western Zhou Dynasty.  His personal name was Lü De (呂得) and ancestral name was Jiang (姜).

Duke Yǐ succeeded his father Duke Ding of Qi, and was succeeded by his son Duke Gui of Qi.

Family
Wives:
 Lady, of the Ji clan of Zhou, personal name Lan; the youngest daughter of King Wu of Zhou

Sons:
 Prince Cimu (d. 902 BC), ruled as Duke Gui of Qi from 932–902 BC

Ancestry

References

Monarchs of Qi (state)
10th-century BC Chinese monarchs